Epilobium tetragonum, commonly known as the square stalked willow herb, is a species of flowering plant in the willowherb family Onagraceae.

It blooms between January and November and produces pink-purple flowers.

The species has become naturalised in the Perth and Peel regions of Western Australia.

References

tetragonum
Plants described in 1753
Rosids of Western Australia
Taxa named by Carl Linnaeus
Flora of Malta